Saint Ishmael may refer to:

People:
 Isfael, an AD 6th-century medieval Welsh bishop of Rhos and saint

Places:
 St Ishmael, Carmarthenshire, a community (civil parish) in Wales
 St Ishmaels, a village and community in Pembrokeshire, Wales